Diejuste is a kind-hearted, benevolent loa in Haitian Vodou.

References

Haitian Vodou gods